"Wrapped" is a song written by the Peruvian singer and songwriter Gian Marco and sung by Gloria Estefan, released as the first single from her tenth studio album Unwrapped. The single returned commercial success to Gloria, having charted in various countries.

Song history
"Wrapped" ("Hoy" in Spanish) became a major hit for Gloria and signified her return to prominence in the charts, as the song was successful in both its English and Spanish versions. This single is Gloria's highest charting song in Switzerland, reaching the Top 3 and it was certified Gold for its strong sales. Gloria also debuted in Belgium within the Ultratip Top 10.

The video, which is the same as the Spanish version of the song, "Hoy", was filmed in Peru in the legendary city Machu Picchu.

This single became the first single Gloria released as a Digital Download, and the Spanish version topped the Downloads charts in Spain. The single was not released commercially in the United States, but the single was available as a single to download at the iTunes music store.

This single become in one of the most successful Spanish singles ever released on her entire career, being a complete success on the charts, especially in Latin America.  The song was a chart-topper on the United States Hot Latin Tracks for four non-consecutive weeks; it also topped the charts on another five countries all of them from Latin America.  It remains as one of the most successful singles ever for Gloria in Argentina in which it was at the number one spot for five weeks. .

"Hoy" and the lyrics for this song were written by Gian Marco Zignago, a Peruvian songwriter and singer.

Due to the success of the song in the Spanish version, the song was added to the setlist in a Salsa remix for the Estefan's 2004 Live & Re-Wrapped Tour, aside the original version in English. Both songs were included on the setlist. "Hoy" was a winner of an International Latin Billboard Music Awards for "Top Pop Airplay Track-Female of the Year" and was also nominated for a "Top Tropical Airplay Track of the Year".

The song is also featured in "On Your Feet," a Broadway musical about the life of Emilio and Gloria Estefan.

A rerecorded version of "Hoy" was included in Estefan's 2020 album Brazil305.

"Wrapped" formats and track listings

"Hoy" formats and track listings

Release history

Charts

Weekly charts
"Wrapped"

"Hoy"

Year-end charts
"Wrapped"

Certifications

Official Versions 
WRAPPED

Original Versions
 Album Version — 3:27

Pablo Flores Remixes
 Pablo Flores Full Remix — 8:17
 Pablo Flores Remix — 3:56
 Pablo Flores Rewrapped Mix — 4:14

Tracy Young Remixes
 Tracy Young Club Version — 9:23
 Tracy Young Remix — 3:47
 Tracy Young "In Yours Arms" Mix — 7:03
 Tracy Young "In Yours Arms" Dub — 9:26
 Tracy Young Acapella Version

HOY

Original Versions
 Spanish Album Version — 3:27
 Salsa Mix — 4:25
 Brazil305 Version — 3:34

Pablo Flores Remixes
 Pablo Flores Full Remix — 8:17
 Pablo Flores Remix — 3:56

Tracy Young Remixes
 Tracy Young Club Version — 9:23
 Tracy Young Remix — 3:47
 Tracy Young Acapella Version

Cover versions
Israeli Singer Roni Dalumi released a cover of this song as her first single under the title "Ten" ('Give'). Her version was released in March 2010 and became her first hit single.
Singer Gian Marco Zignago Peruvian musician covered the song in his album Desde dentro. Gian Marco is the co-writer of the English version with Gloria Estefan.
Singer Raquel Olmedo also a Cuban / Mexican actress covered the song in her album Con el alma en cueros, released in 2009.
Spanish singer India Martínez covered the song in her album Otras verdades, released in 2012.

References
#https://web.archive.org/web/20091027084359/http://www.geocities.com/weslarkins/glorialibre.html gloriaestefandiscographydatabase

2003 singles
Gloria Estefan songs
Songs written by Gian Marco
2003 songs
Epic Records singles
Songs written by Gloria Estefan